Ring Ring Ring may refer to:

Songs
 "Ring Ring Ring (Ha Ha Hey)", a 1991 song by De La Soul.
 "Ring Ring Ring", a 2001 song by Aaron Soul
 "Ring Ring Ring", a 2009 song by Kurd Maverick
 "Ring Ring Ring", a 1985 Eurovision song by Merethe Trøan
 "Ring Ring Ring", a 2017 song by Mikael Gabriel
 "Ring Ring Ring", a 2006 song by S.H.E. from Forever
 "Ring Ring Ring", a 2019 song by Verivery from Veri-Us
 "Ring, Ring, Ring", a 2003 song by Brian Setzer from Nitro Burnin' Funny Daddy
 "Ring, Ring, Ring", a 1984 song by Joaquin Sabrina from Ruleta Rusa
 "Ring Ring Ring!", a 2007 song from Little Busters!
 "Ring! Ring! Ring!", a 2009 song by Scandal from Best Scandal

Other uses
 "Ring Ring Ring" (chapter 76), a serialized manga chapter of Chainsaw Man

See also

 Three Rings (disambiguation)
 Ring 3 (disambiguation)
 Ring (disambiguation)